Renate Radek is a protistologist and an associate professor at the Freie Universität Berlin.

Education
Radek received a Diploma in biology from the University of Bonn in 1985.

Career
Radek worked as a research and teaching assistant at the University of Bonn (1987–1988), Freie Universität Berlin (1989–1996), the University of Heidelberg (1996–1999), and again at the Freie Universität Berlin (2000–2008), where she worked under the protistologist Klaus Hausmann. In 2008, upon completing her Habilitation, she was promoted to associate professor.

Radek has been an editorial board member at the European Journal of Protistology and an external reviewer for Acta Protozoologica since 2005, and a member of the board of reviewers at the Journal of Eukaryotic Microbiology since 2012. She is managing director of the German Society for Protozoology and is also a member of the Berlin Microscopical Society, the German Society for Parasitology, the International Society of Protistologists, and the Society for Invertebrate Pathology.

Research
Over the course of her career, Radek has published almost 100 scientific papers, eleven book chapters, and two protistology textbooks. One of these textbooks, Protistology, has been translated into Chinese, Russian, and Korean. In 1991, she created a scientific film about termite flagellates with Klaus Hausmann.

Her current focus is on the biology and morphology of protists that live as symbionts and parasites in diverse insect hosts, notably termite gut flagellates and spore-forming protists (some of which, like the nephridiophagids, are now thought to be fungi) in cockroaches and beetles. She is also interested in the relationship between protists and their prokaryotic symbionts.

References

Living people
21st-century German biologists
German women biologists
Protistologists
Academic staff of the Free University of Berlin
Year of birth missing (living people)